Surrender is the second studio album by American pop singer-songwriter Maggie Rogers, released on July 29, 2022 by Debay Sounds and Capitol Records. It follows the release of her 2019 debut studio album, Heard It in a Past Life.

The album features a couple of contributions from notable singers. The track "Shatter" features Florence Welch of Florence and the Machine providing additional vocals and playing tambourine, and "I've Got a Friend" features Clairo and Claud speaking.

Background and promotion
Rogers teased recording sessions for her forthcoming second studio album throughout 2021 into early 2022. She stated that the album would be self-produced and sounded like "feral joy", which is what she would later name her tour in support of the album. In March 2022, Rogers shared a link to a site counting down to March 30. On that day, she announced that her second studio album, titled Surrender, would be released on July 29, 2022. Rogers simultaneously released an album trailer she co-directed with Michael Scanlon. On June 15, 2022, Rogers revealed the album's track listing via Instagram.

Composition
Surrender is an indie pop, alternative pop, and electropop album with elements of alternative rock, dance, Americana, new wave, electroacoustic, slacker rock, synth-pop, folk, glam rock, and sunshine pop.

Critical reception

Track listing

Personnel
Credits are adapted from the Surrender liner notes.

Musicians

 Maggie Rogers – vocals (all tracks), piano (1, 3, 4, 8, 10, 11), clapping (2), synthesizer (2–4, 6, 10, 11), drum programming (3), programming (4), electric guitar (5), acoustic guitar (8)
 Kid Harpoon – bass, electric guitar, synthesizer (1–8, 10, 11); drums (1, 2, 7, 8, 10, 11), 12-string acoustic guitar (2), acoustic guitar (2, 5, 9), drum programming (2–7, 10, 11), programming (4), piano (7, 10), synth bass (8, 10)
 Pino Palladino – bass (1, 9)
 Giveton Gelin – trumpet (1)
 Jeremy Hatcher – vocal programming (1, 2, 10)
 Ben Lovett – synthesizer (2, 7), piano (7)
 Del Water Gap – drum programming (3); electric guitar, programming, synthesizer (4)
 Matt Barrick – drums (3)
 Aaron Sterling – drums (4)
 Jon Batiste – piano (6, 9), synthesizer (6), melodica (8)
 Florence Welch – additional vocals, tambourine (7)
 Claire Cottrill – speaker (9)
 Claud – speaker (9)
 Gabe Goodman – acoustic guitar, bass, drum programming, piano, synthesizer (11)

Technical

 Emily Lazar – mastering
 Chris Allgood – mastering
 Mark "Spike" Stent – mixing
 Jeremy Hatcher – engineering
 Mark Rankin – engineering (1–4, 6–9)
 Gabe Goodman – engineering (3, 11)
 Matt Wolach – mixing assistance
 Del Water Gap – additional engineering (4)
 Carl Bespolka – additional engineering (7, 9), engineering assistance (1–9, 11)
 Katie May – engineering assistance (1–9, 11)
 Lance Powell – engineering assistance (10, 11)

Charts

References

External links
 

2022 albums
Maggie Rogers albums
Albums produced by Kid Harpoon
Albums recorded at Electric Lady Studios
Albums recorded in a home studio